Microangiopathic hemolytic anemia (MAHA) is a microangiopathic subgroup of hemolytic anemia (loss of red blood cells through destruction) caused by factors in the small blood vessels. It is identified by the finding of anemia and schistocytes on microscopy of the blood film.

Signs and symptoms
In diseases such as hemolytic uremic syndrome, disseminated intravascular coagulation, thrombotic thrombocytopenic purpura, and malignant hypertension, the endothelial layer of small vessels is damaged with resulting fibrin deposition and platelet aggregation.  As red blood cells travel through these damaged vessels, they are fragmented resulting in intravascular hemolysis. The resulting schistocytes (red cell fragments) are also increasingly targeted for destruction by the reticuloendothelial system in the spleen, due to their narrow passage through obstructed vessel lumina. It is seen in systemic lupus erythematosus, where immune complexes aggregate with platelets, forming intravascular thrombi. Microangiopathic hemolytic anemia is also seen in cancer.

Microangiopathic hemolytic anemia may be suspected based on routine medical laboratory tests such as a CBC (complete blood cell count). Automated analysers (the machines that perform routine full blood counts in most hospitals) are designed to flag blood specimens that contain abnormal amounts of red blood cell fragments or schistocytes.

Causes 
 Disseminated intravascular coagulation
 HELLP syndrome
 Thrombotic thrombocytopenic purpura
 Hemolytic uremic syndrome
 Cancer
 Malignant hypertension
 Scleroderma renal crisis
 Malfunctioning cardiac valves (called the "Waring Blender syndrome")
 Kasabach–Merritt syndrome
 Insertion of foreign bodies
 Drugs (e.g. cancer chemotherapy)
 others diseases: eclampsia, renal allograft rejection, paroxysmal nocturnal hemoglobinuria, scleroderma, and vasculitides such as polyarteritis nodosa and granulomatosis with polyangiitis, antiphospholipid syndrome

Pathophysiology
In all causes, the mechanism of MAHA is the formation of a fibrin mesh due to increased activation of the system of coagulation. The red blood cells are physically cut by these protein networks. The resulting fragments are the schistocytes observed in light microscopy

Diagnosis
Microangiopathic hemolytic anemia results in isolated increase in serum bilirubin levels. Unconjugated hyperbilirubinemia above 15% is present. The differential diagnoses are rifampicin or probenecid use, inherited disorders like Gilbert's syndrome and other hemolytic disorders. On Peripheral smear fragmented Burr and helmet shaped RBC are seen

Treatment
Platelets and cryoprecipitate are contraindicated as they facilitate further clot formation and RBC lysis. Plasmapheresis is one treatment for TTP; corticosteroids should also be considered. {mcn}

References

External links 

Nephrology
Acquired hemolytic anemia